Stefan Ristovski (Macedonian: Стефан Ристовски) (born 21 December 1992 in Republic of Macedonia) is a Macedonian football player.

External links
Stefan Ristovski at PrvaLiga 

1992 births
Living people
Macedonian footballers
Association football defenders
FK Vardar players
NK Celje players
NK Šmartno 1928 players
FK Horizont Turnovo players
FK Bregalnica Štip players
Macedonian First Football League players
Slovenian PrvaLiga players
Slovenian Second League players
Macedonian expatriate footballers
Expatriate footballers in Slovenia
Macedonian expatriate sportspeople in Slovenia